Gioele Dix, a pseudonym of his name David Ottolenghi (born 3 January 1956) is an Italian actor and comedian of Jewish descent.

Life 
Gioele Dix began his theatrical career at the end of the 1970s, promoting and animating the Milan stage company Teatro degli Eguali. Among the numerous plays he took part in, are:  A Midsummer Night's Dream, a rock musical from  Shakespeare directed by Gabriele Salvatores;  A Martian in Rome by Ennio Flaiano and directed by Antonio Salines; two stagings of Molière’s, Le Malade imaginaire and Tartuffe with veteran actor Franco Parenti. Intending to pursue a career as stand-up comedian, he appeared at the Derby Club and the Zelig, important historical Milan cabarets, reaching fame in 1988 in the TV variety show Cocco by RAI2 with the character of a permanently enraged car driver ("fucking raving mad!").

In the 1990s he confirms his popularity as a stage actor, as well as a playwright, in a number of works and on TV, but often also as a comedian sending up and imitating renowned soccer players in prime-time Sports shows.

In the last few years, Dix had various movie engagements and filmed for the national TV together with Giorgio Albertazzi in 2004. Among the many theatrical works, he interpreted Cuori pazzi (Crazy Hearts) by F.T Altan (2000), Il libertino (The Libertine) by E.E. Schmitt together with Ottavia Piccolo (2001) where he is the first Italian man playing naked, Corto Maltese from scripts by Hugo Pratt and music by Paolo Conte. Recently he returned to the stage with Edipo.com, directed by famous Italian star Sergio Fantoni (2003); then La Bibbia ha quasi sempre ragione (The Bible Is Almost Always Right) with Cesare Picco at the piano (2004), all of them pièces enhancing the narrative dimension of the story, thus exploiting Dix’s natural talent as a raconteur.

In 2007 he was engaged in the cast of Zelig (a popular comedy TV show) as one of the comedians, interpreting his now famous caricature of the "permanently enraged car driver".

In  2008 he staged Tutta colpa di Garibaldi (It’s All Garibaldi’s Fault) with scripts by Gioele Dix, Sergio Fantoni and Nicola Fano, directed by Sergio Fantoni; he followed with the play Dixplay by himself, with the participation of Bebo Best Baldan.

Quote

Filmography 
Crimini - Disegno di sangue, directed by Gianfranco Cabiddu per RAI2
Tracce di vita amorosa, directed by Peter Del Monte (1990)
Per non dimenticare, directed by Massimo Martelli (1992)
Tre passi nel delitto, directed by Fabrizio Laurenti (1993)
Bidoni, directed by Felice Farina (1995)
Olimpo Lupo, cronista di nera, directed by Fabrizio Laurenti (1995)
Uno di noi, (1996)
All the Moron's Men (1999)
Se fossi in te, directed by Giulio Manfredonia (2001)
Cerco lavoro, directed by Fratelli Frazzi (2002)
Marcinelle, directed by Vincenzo Verdecchi (2004)
Ora e per sempre, directed by Vincenzo Verdecchi (2004)
Ricomincio da me, directed by Rossella Izzo (2005)
A voce alta, directed by Vincenzo Verdecchi (2006)
Tutti i rumori del mondo, directed by Tiziana Aristarco (2007)
Happily Mixed Up, directed by Massimiliano Bruno (2014)

Theatre 
La mia patente non scade mai, regia di Gioele Dix, (1988)(1989)
Mai a stomaco vuoto, regia di Gioele Dix, (1990)
Antologia di Edipo, regia di Gioele Dix, (1991)(1992)
Anna, regia di Gioele Dix, (1992)(1993)
Sto ristrutturando, regia di Gioele Dix, (1993)(1994)
Questa estate, regia di Gioele Dix, (1994)
Cinque Dix, regia di Gioele Dix, (1995)
Mi sembra che andiamo bene, regia di Gioele Dix, (1997)(1998)
L'uomo degli appuntamenti, regia di Gioele Dix, (1998)Recital, regia di Gioele Dix, (1999)Agamennone, regia di Giorgio Gallione, (2000)Cuori pazzi, regia di Giorgio Gallione, (2000)(2001)Il Libertino, regia di Sergio Fantoni, (2001)(2002)Mappa del nuovo mondo, lettura delle liriche di Derek Walcott, regia di Piero Maccarinelli, (2002)A posto così, regia di Gioele Dix, (2002)Corto Maltese, regia di Giorgio Gallione, (2003)(2004)Edipo.com, regia di Sergio Fantoni, (2003)(2004)(2005)La Bibbia ha (quasi) sempre ragione, regia di Andree Ruth Shamma, (2003)(2004)(2005)(2006)(2007)Grand Tour, cronache di viaggiatori illustri, regia di Gioele Dix, (2004)Amore a prima vista, letture delle poesie con regia di Wislawa Szimborska, (2004)I ragazzi hanno orecchie, interpretazione delle fiabe di Fernand Deligny, regia di Gioele Dix, (2005)Meglio il nuovo oggi (L'innovazione fa spettacolo), regia di Serena Sinigaglia, (2006)Tutta colpa di Garibaldi, regia di Sergio Fantoni, (2008)Dixplay, regia di Giancarlo Bozzo, (2008)

 Bibliography 
Dix has also published some books on amusing themes: 
 Il manuale del vero automobilista (Manual Of The True Car Driver) (M.M., 1991)
 Cinque Dix (Five Dix) (Baldini&Castoldi, 1995)
 La Bibbia ha quasi sempre ragione (The Bible Is Almost Always Right) (Mondadori, 2003)
 Manuale dell'automobilista incazzato (Manual Of The Friggin’ Mad Car Driver) (Mondadori, 2007)

 External links 
 
 Official YouTube Account
"Gieole Dix, My Roots", by C. Cannella (Corriere della Sera'', 2004)
 

Italian comedians
20th-century Italian Jews
Jewish male comedians
Jewish male actors
Male actors from Milan
Living people
1956 births